Jikey or Yikey is a form of traditional religious dance originated from India and commonly practiced by communities in several Southeast Asian countries such as Cambodia, Malaysia, Thailand, and Vietnam. Specifically, there are two major types of Jikey in Thailand, the one in central region tend to have more Buddhist characteristic adopted its original Indian form, meanwhile in the southern region it bear more Islamic characteristic as it is heavily influenced by the Persian and Arabs-derived culture which characterized by the usage of Middle Eastern musical instruments such as the tambourine, etc.

Since 2015, Cambodia has submitted Jikey (យីកេ) as one of its Intangible Cultural Heritages to the UNESCO (United Nations Educational, Scientific and Cultural Organization).

Performance
The main elements of Jikey are improvised dialogue, music and dance, and local legends formed the main repertoire with considerable emphasis placed on slapstick comedy. The Jikey music consists of both instrumental and singing. The main characters are comedians, king and warriors, and a form of leitmotif is involved as various characters in the drama are identified with specific elements in the music.

Instruments
However, typical ensembles consists only of a violin, 3 rebana and 2  or bamboo stampers.

Notes

References

Performing arts in Cambodia
Cambodian dances
Malay culture
Malay dances
Malaysian culture
Dances of Malaysia
Thai culture
Articles containing video clips